Fletcher Roseberry Jones (January 22, 1931November 7, 1972) was an American businessman, computer pioneer and Thoroughbred racehorse owner.

Early life and education
Born in Bryan, Texas, Jones was the third of three children of an impoverished Depression era family. He graduated from Allen Military Academy in 1949, then studied at university for two years, but did not graduate. His interest in mathematics led to jobs in the fledgling computer departments at aviation companies. Married in 1951, he was transferred to California by his employer, North American Aviation Corp. After time at the company's offices in Columbus, Ohio, Jones and his wife and two small children settled in Los Angeles where he managed a North American Aviation computer center.

Career
In 1959, Fletcher Jones went into business with Roy Nutt, a widely respected computer programmer who had been working for United Aircraft Corp. The two founded a software services company named Computer Sciences Corporation (CSC), when Jones, who ran the business and marketing end of things, obtained a contract from Honeywell that gave their business profitability and respect within the industry. In 1961, the company made a major move into the space industry when they obtained a contract to support NASA Jet Propulsion Laboratory's Flight Operations Facility. Within four years of its founding, CSC became the largest software company in the United States. Taking their business public with an IPO listed on the American Stock Exchange, Jones and Nutt had become multi-millionaires. By the end of the 1960s, CSC was listed on the New York Stock Exchange and had operations in Canada, the United Kingdom, (Germany), Italy, and in the Netherlands.

Westerly Stud Farms 
As a hobby business, Fletcher Jones became involved in the breeding and racing of Thoroughbred horses. In 1966, he acquired a  property near Santa Ynez, California that he named Westerly Stud Farms. In addition to a large home, he built a U-shaped main barn, breeding sheds, and other service buildings, as well as a half-mile training track. In order to spend more time on his farm, Jones built an airstrip and piloted his own aircraft to and from the Santa Monica airport near where his office was located.

Westerly Stud Farms' best known horse was Typecast, a filly who won the 1972 Eclipse Award as the American Champion Older Female Horse.

Selected stakes race wins for Westerly Stud Farms
 Frank E. Kilroe Mile – Fleet Host (1967)
 San Luis Rey Handicap – Fleet Host (1967)
 San Carlos Handicap – Rising Market (1970)
 San Simeon Handicap – Long Position (1971)
 Las Palmas Handicap – Typecast (1971)
 Del Mar Oaks – House of Cards (1972)
 Santa Monica Handicap – Typecast (1972)
 Hollywood Invitational Turf Handicap – Typecast (1972)
 Man o' War Stakes – Typecast (1972)

Fletcher Jones gave CSC employee Martin J. Wygod his first two horses as a birthday gift. Wygod and his wife Pam have remained major owners of racing Thoroughbreds ever since.

The Westerly Stud property was sold in an estate dispersal sale in 1973. Since then, its  has been subdivided into a number of small parcels, including a section that became the D. Wayne Lukas Westerly training center.

Art collection 
Fletcher Jones began purchasing art, particularly works by the French Impressionists. He owned paintings by Edgar Degas, Claude Monet, Pierre Bonnard, Camille Pissarro. As well, he acquired four Picassos, notably his 1901 self-portrait titled Yo, Picasso that was sold by Jones's estate and which, in 1989, would be purchased by the Greek shipping magnate, Stavros Niarchos for US$47.85 million.

Death and Foundation 
On November 7, 1972, the forty-one-year-old Jones died when the plane he was piloting home crashed into a hillside. He is buried in the Oak Hill Cemetery in the Santa Ynez Valley.

Jones had divorced his wife in the early 1960s and his estate provided a trust fund for his two sons, Jeffery and Scott, but the bulk of his fortune went to his Fletcher Jones Foundation.

Five months after Jones' death, actress Sherry Jackson, who had lived with him from 1967 until his death, sued his estate for palimony. Jackson's suit asked for more than $1 million ($ million today), with her attorneys stating that Jones had promised to provide her with at least $25,000 a year for the rest of her life.

Jones' art collection was liquidated by his estate as well as Westerly Stud Farms. Although he was never a philanthropist in life, his Foundation continues to operate and has made considerable donations, primarily to California colleges and universities. Current and former Fletcher Jones Professorships include:
Michael A. Arbib (Computer Science) at University of Southern California, Emeritus
Mark Blitz (Political Philosophy) at Claremont McKenna College
Tom Campbell (Law) at Chapman University School of Law
Satyan Devadoss (Computer Science) at University of San Diego
Gerald Fuller (Chemical Engineering) at Stanford University
Seymour Ginsburg (Computer Science) at University of Southern California
Ken Gonzales-Day (Art) at Scripps College
Gene H. Golub (Computer Science, Electrical Engineering) at Stanford University
John Grotzinger (Geology) at California Institute of Technology
Menas Kafatos (Computational Physics) at Chapman University
Donald E. Knuth (Computer Science) at Stanford University, Emeritus
Rubén Martínez (Literature & Writing) at Loyola Marymount University
Susan Rankaitis (Studio Art) at Scripps College
Greg Sarris (Creative Writing and Literature) at Loyola Marymount University
Kevin Sharpe (History) at the Huntington Library
Gary Smith (Economics) at Pomona College
Ivan Sutherland (Computer Science) at California Institute of Technology
Marcos Villatoro (Creative Writing) at Mount St. Mary's University, Los Angeles
Jennifer Widom (Computer Science) at Stanford University

The University of California, Merced also awards a Fletcher Jones fellowship to graduate students, based on funds from the foundation.

References

External links
 The Fletcher Jones Foundation

1931 births
1972 deaths
American computer businesspeople
Businesspeople in software
American racehorse owners and breeders
American art collectors
Aviators killed in aviation accidents or incidents in the United States
People from Bryan, Texas
Accidental deaths in California
20th-century American businesspeople
Businesspeople from Texas
Victims of aviation accidents or incidents in 1972